QSP can mean one of the following: 

 Quality Samples Program, provides small samples of U.S. agricultural produce to foreign importers
 Quantitative systems pharmacology
 Quatro Scott Powell, a rock band composed of Suzi Quatro, Andy Scott and Don Powell
 Quick Start Programme, a fund administered by the United Nations Environment Programme
 Socialist Party of Kazakhstan (QSP), a former political party in Kazakhstan